The 1982 Michigan gubernatorial election was held on November 2, 1982.

The Democratic candidate was Congressman James Blanchard and the Republican candidate was insurance executive Richard Headlee.

Primary elections
The primary elections occurred on August 10, 1982.

Democratic primary

Republican primary

General election

Results

References

1982
Governor
Michigan